Jiu Si may refer to:

"Nine Longings", a major section of the ancient Chinese poetry collection Chu Ci
Nine Courts, top service agencies of the central government during imperial China

See also
Jiusi, Hubei (旧司), a town in Laifeng County, Hubei, China